We Cheer is a dance video game published by Namco Bandai Games.

Overview
The game sees the player leading a squad of cheerleaders through a routine by following lines and swirls that appear on screen by motioning the Wii Remote. For single player and two player games, two Remotes for each player (one per hand) are required, but in four player games each player can use a single Remote only. The game has the player performing physical motions ranging from single motion thrusts, to elaborate zig-zagging actions and windmilling whole arm motions.

We Cheer also allows players to customize their cheer squad including their hair color and uniforms (though only female cheerleaders will be available), and additional outfits and squad members can be unlocked by collecting gold pompoms earned after a successful routine. The game also features a workout mode that keeps track of the number of calories burned by the player during play.

Soundtrack
The game features 36 licensed music tracks, including The Great Escape by Boys Like Girls, That's the Way (I Like It) by KC & the Sunshine Band, and ...Baby One More Time by Britney Spears.

Reception

The game received "mixed" reviews according to the review aggregation website Metacritic.

See also
All Star Cheer Squad
Elite Beat Agents
Helix
We Ski
We Ski & Snowboard
We Cheer 2

References

2008 video games
505 Games games
Cheerleader video games
Cheerleading
Music video games
Bandai Namco games
Bandai Namco Entertainment franchises
Video games developed in Japan
Video games featuring female protagonists
Wii-only games
Wii games